"The Heresy of Paraphrase" is the title of a chapter in The Well-Wrought Urn, a seminal work of the New Criticism by Cleanth Brooks.  Brooks argued that meaning in poetry is irreducible, because "a true poem is a simulacrum of reality...an experience rather than any mere statement about experience or any mere abstraction from experience."  Brooks emphasized structure, tension, balance, and irony over meaning, statement, and subject matter.  He relied on comparisons with non-verbal arts in order to shift discussion away from summarizable content:The essential structure of a poem (as distinguished from the rational or logical structure of the 'statement' which we abstract from it) resembles that of architecture or painting: it is a pattern of resolved stresses.  Or, to move closer still to poetry by considering the temporal arts, the structure of a poem resembles that of a ballet or musical composition. It is a pattern of resolutions and balances and harmonization, developed through a temporal scheme.

Proper criticism responds with suppleness and delicacy to such patterns, rather than paraphrasing their propositional content.

Central to "The Heresy of Paraphrase" was a vigorous critique of conventional distinctions between form and content:The structure meant is certainly not 'form' in the conventional sense in which we think of form as a kind of envelope which 'contains' the 'content.' The structure obviously is everywhere conditioned by the nature of the material which goes into the poem.  The nature of the material sets the problem to be solved, and the solution is the ordering of the material...The relationship between the intellectual and the non-intellectual elements in a poem is actually far more intimate than the conventional accounts would represent it to be: the relationship is not that of an idea 'wrapped in emotion' or a 'prose-sense decorated by sensuous imagery.

Though Brooks applied this theory to his reading of poetry from many periods, subsequent literary scholars have suggested that the doctrine was shaped by the aesthetics of modernist literature.  They point out that the New Criticism emerged at the peak of T. S. Eliot's influence as both poet and critic.  Archibald Macleish's "Ars Poetica" (written eleven years before The Well Wrought Urn) is often cited as prefiguring Brooks' doctrine:A poem should be palpable and mute
As a globed fruit

Dumb
As old medallions to the thumb

Silent as the sleeve-worn stone
Of casement ledges where the moss has grown –

A poem should be wordless
As the flight of birds

A poem should be motionless in time
As the moon climbs

Leaving, as the moon releases
Twig by twig the night-entangled trees,

Leaving, as the moon behind the winter leaves,
Memory by memory the mind –

A poem should be motionless in time
As the moon climbs

A poem should be equal to:
Not true

For all the history of grief
An empty doorway and a maple leaf

For love
The leaning grasses and two lights above the sea –

A poem should not mean
But be.

Though many of the aesthetic assumptions of the New Criticism are now challenged or dismissed, the "heresy of paraphrase" is still commonly used to refer to reductive or utilitarian approaches to poetry.

References

Essays about poetry
New Criticism
1947 essays